Albert Mayaud (31 March 1899 – 14 August 1987) was a French water polo player and freestyle swimmer who competed at the 1920 and 1924 Summer Olympics.

In 1920, Mayaud was eliminated in the first round of the water polo tournament and the 4×200 metre freestyle swimming event. Four years later, at the Paris Games, he won the gold medal with the French water polo team. He played all four matches and scored three goals.

See also
 France men's Olympic water polo team records and statistics
 List of Olympic champions in men's water polo
 List of Olympic medalists in water polo (men)

References

External links

 

1899 births
1987 deaths
Water polo players from Paris
French male water polo players
French male freestyle swimmers
Olympic water polo players of France
Olympic swimmers of France
Swimmers at the 1920 Summer Olympics
Water polo players at the 1920 Summer Olympics
Water polo players at the 1924 Summer Olympics
Olympic gold medalists for France
Olympic medalists in water polo
Medalists at the 1924 Summer Olympics
Swimmers from Paris